Thomas James Price (born 2 January 2000) is an English cricketer.

Personal
Price was educated at Magdalen College School and Durham University.

Career
Price played youth team cricket for Great & Little Tew Cricket Club in Oxfordshire, and represented the county at age-group level before joining the academy at Gloucestershire. He signed his first professional contract with Gloucestershire in January 2020, having made his List A debut for the club on 30 June 2019, in a match against Australia A. He made his first-class debut on 1 August 2020 against Worcestershire in the 2020 Bob Willis Trophy, taking one wicket in the first innings and collecting a pair with the bat. He made his Twenty20 debut on 29 May 2022, for Gloucestershire against the Sri Lanka Cricket Development XI during their tour of England.

In June 2022, in the County Championship match against Kent, Price took a hat-trick and his maiden five-wicket haul in first-class cricket.

References

External links
 

2000 births
Living people
English cricketers
Gloucestershire cricketers
Cricketers from Oxford
English cricketers of the 21st century
People educated at Magdalen College School, Oxford
Alumni of Durham University